Henry Holgate Watson (December 25, 1867 – January 19, 1949) was a druggist and political figure in British Columbia. He represented Vancouver City from 1909 to 1916 in the Legislative Assembly of British Columbia as a Conservative.

He was born in Milton, Ontario, the son of Henry Watson and Jane Elizabeth Holgate, and was educated in Milton and at Upper Canada College. In 1892, Watson married Kathleen Constance Black. He died in Vancouver at the age of 81.

References 

1867 births
1939 deaths
British Columbia Conservative Party MLAs
Upper Canada College alumni